UTV Action (formerly Bindass Movies) was an Indian pay television movie channel that featured American animated and live-action Hollywood movies in Hindi dub. It also often aired some other country's films. It was based partly in Mumbai, Maharashtra. Initially created as UTV Bindass Movies, a youth-oriented Hindi movie channel, it was later re-branded UTV Action in 2010.

Other versions

UTV HD 

UTV HD India was a Hindi-language movie channel owned by Disney Star. The channel showcased Hindi dubbed international movies.

UTV Action Telugu 

UTV Action Telugu was a Telugu version of the Hindi movie channel UTV Action that showed Hollywood movies dubbed into Telugu. It was launched on 26 June 2011 and closed down on 30 November 2012.

References

External links
 UTV Action Official website

Television stations in Mumbai
Movie channels in India
Television channels and stations established in 2010
UTV Software Communications
Disney India Media Networks
Disney Star